The Kerch Peninsula is a major and prominent geographic peninsula located at the eastern end of the Crimean Peninsula, Ukraine, currently under occupation by Russia

This peninsula stretches eastward toward the Taman Peninsula between the Sea of Azov and the Black Sea. Most of the peninsula is located within the Lenine Raion.

Names
In Classical Antiquity, the area was known as the "Rough Peninsula" (Greek: Χερσόνησος Τραχεία).

Geography
On elevated portions of the isthmus, named after the village of Kamianske (former Aq-Monai), are seen both of the surrounding seas.

The southern coast of the Kerch peninsula is washed by the Black Sea and the Bay of Feodosia, to the east as a natural border serves the Strait of Kerch, while the northern shores are part of the coastline of the Sea of Azov, Kazantip Bay, and Bay of Arabat. Away to the northwest from the peninsula runs another isthmus known as the Arabat Spit (locally Arabat arrow) which separates Sivash (the Rotten Sea) from Azov Sea. Other prominent features of the peninsula are Mount Mithridat located in the east at the shores of the Strait of Kerch and the Ararat Mountain located just west of the Kerch city, both of which are part of the northeastern elevated region. At the southeastern portion of peninsula are located mountains Sosman and Kharuchu-Oba. The Kerch Peninsula, as well as surrounding areas such as Azerbaijan, Iran, Russia, and the Caspian Sea region (which encompasses the Caucasus and Central Asia) are home to many mud volcanoes. These mud volcanoes are important for the region's oil industry.

Capes
Black Sea
 Chauda
 Opuk
 Takhil
Sea of Azov
 Malyi
 Fonar
 Khroni
 Zyuk
 Chahany
 Kazan-Tip
 Kiten
 Krasny Kut

Lakes, rivers, bays
Beside the above-mentioned bays there are also Mysova bay and Tatarska bay, both located around the Kazan-Tip Cape making it look as a small peninsula.

 Uzunlarske Lake
 Kachyk lake
 Koyashskoye Salt Lake
 Tobechytske Lake
 Aqtas Lake

Nature preserves
On the territory of the peninsula are located several natural preserves (zapovedniks):
 Opuksky Nature Reserve, the only place in Ukraine where rosy starlings nest
 Kazan-Tip Natural Preserve
 Ostanine floodplains, a state zakaznik near settlement Ostanine

Historical sites
 Turkish wall, a defensive wall that stretches across the peninsula from Bay of Kazan-Tip to the lake of Koyashs'ke

See also
 Battle of the Kerch Peninsula — an offensive by the Axis powers against Soviet troops in World War II.
 Myrmekion
 Panticapaeum
 Siberia Airlines Flight 1812

References

External links

  Kerch Peninsula at the Great Soviet Encyclopedia
  More detailed description of the peninsula by Arkadi Tebelev
  РЕКИ И БАЛКИ КЕРЧЕНСКОГО ПОЛУОСТРОВА
 Several maps of the region

 
Landforms of Crimea
Peninsulas of Russia
Peninsulas of Ukraine